The women's discus throw at the 2022 World Athletics U20 Championships was held at Estadio Olímpico Pascual Guerrero on 1 and 3 August.

Records

Results

Qualification
The qualification round took place on 1 August, in two groups, with Group A starting at 15:00 and Group B starting at 16:27. Athletes attaining a mark of at least 52.50 metres ( Q ) or at least the 12 best performers ( q ) qualified for the final.

Final
The final was held on 3 August at 18:12.

References

discus throw
Discus throw at the World Athletics U20 Championships